Genius Squad is a novel written by Catherine Jinks published in 2008 by Allen & Unwin, Australia. It is the second book in a series that follows the main character Cadel Piggot, a young genius living in Australia. It was a 2009 recipient of the Davitt Award.

Plot summary
The book begins roughly 5 months after the events of Evil Genius. Cadel is now living with foster parents in a state of legal limbo, not knowing where he was born or his true father. His life is made even worse due to his foster brother "Mace" (real name: Thomas) is constantly bullying him. With no school to attend due to his questionable legal status, Cadel spends his time either on the computer, idling or visiting Sonja. The police and the FBI also occasionally turn up to question him on what he knows about Dr. Darkkon, Prosper English and the Axis Institute. During these questionings Cadel meets Saul Greeniaus, a detective who is now in charge of his case. His style puts him in conflict with Cadel's social worker, Fiona Currey. On his second visit to Sonja he is confronted by Trader Lynch and Judith Bashford. Trader and Judith attempt to convince Sonja and Cadel to join Genius Squad, An organisation formed to take down GENOME [a corporation founded by Darkkon] which is funded by Rex Austin, an American billionaire who suspects the company murdered his son, Jimmy. The book ends with Cadel being told that a man named Chester Cramp is his father. He is offered a spot in Fiona and Saul's family
 

While Saul and Fiona initially object, they relent after a particularly heated confrontation with "Mace". Cadel arrives at the youth home, where Saul and Fiona help him move his belongings. Cadel is introduced to Devin and Lexi Winiecki, Hamish Primrose, Dot[the sister of Com from Evil Genius] and the rest of the adult staff. While Genius Squad works away, trying to avoid notice by Cadel's various bodyguards, they uncover a web of deceit, crimes and cerebral implants. During this time, "Mace" finds the address of the Genius Squad foster house and attempts to frame Cadel for theft by planting a stolen watch on him (a plan which ultimately fails and leads to Mace's arrest). Cadel also finds that Gazo Kovacs has made contact with GenoME, unaware of their sinister intentions. Unfortunately, GenoME manages to spring Prosper from jail and he immediately moves to kidnap Cadel. Cadel is taken to the house of Judith, one of the other members of Genius squad. From here, Prosper flees to a private air strip to leave the country after Cadel attempts to contact Saul for help. Saul gets a group of police officers down to the airport in time to save Cadel, but Prosper manages to get away. At this point, paternity tests show that Prosper English isn't really Cadel's father, even though he thought he was. Cadel's real father is Chester Cramp, who runs Fountain Pharmaceuticals, another Darkkon corporation. However, with Chester sitting in an American Jail.  Cadel agrees to being adopted by Saul and Fiona, who happened to be getting married.

Saul finally finds out about Genius Squad, and though he is very upset that Cadel lied to him for so long, he agrees to let Genius Squad live on. His reasoning for this, is that he believes that Genius Squad might just be their best chance of finding Prosper and bringing him down once and for all.

References

External links
 Evil Genius series blog
 Catherine Jinks official website

2008 novels
Australian science fiction novels
Australian fantasy novels
2008 science fiction novels
Children's science fiction novels
Australian young adult novels
Novels by Catherine Jinks
Allen & Unwin books
2008 children's books